Foro Lindbergh is a plaza in Mexico City's Parque México, in Mexico.

References

External links

 

Plazas in Mexico City
Condesa